Guido Gianfardoni (25 February 1901 – 26 April 1941) was an Italian professional football player and coach.

Honours
 Italian Football Championship champion: 1925/26.
 Serie A champion: 1929/30.

1901 births
1941 deaths
Italian footballers
Serie A players
Novara F.C. players
Juventus F.C. players
Inter Milan players
U.S. Lecce players
U.S. Cremonese players
Italian football managers
Spezia Calcio managers
Ternana Calcio managers
Association football defenders